Müdrəsə (also, Mədrəsə, Müdrusə, Myudresa, and Myudryuse) is a village and municipality in the Ismailli Rayon of Azerbaijan.  It has a population of 157.  The municipality consists of the villages of Müdrəsə and Pirəqanım.

References 

Populated places in Ismayilli District